The 2002–03 NBA season was the Rockets' 36th season in the National Basketball Association, and 32nd season in the city of Houston. This was their final season playing at the Compaq Center. The Rockets won the Draft Lottery, where they selected 7'6" Chinese sensation Yao Ming with the first overall pick in the 2002 NBA draft. In December, the Rockets acquired James Posey from the Denver Nuggets in a three-team trade, which sent Kenny Thomas to the Philadelphia 76ers.

The Rockets got off to a 9–6 start, and played .500 basketball for the remainder of the season, holding a 26–22 record at the All-Star break. With Yao teamed up with captain Steve Francis, they gelled their first season together, being named as starters for the 2003 NBA All-Star Game. On January 17, 2003, Francis gained national media attention, scoring a career-high 44 points in a home game against the Los Angeles Lakers. The Rockets finished the season fifth in the Midwest Division with a 43–39 record without clinching a playoff spot, finishing just one game behind the 8th-seeded Phoenix Suns, although they improved on last season, where they won just 28 games. Yao averaged 13.5 points, 8.2 rebounds and 1.8 blocks per game, was named to the NBA All-Rookie First Team, and finished in second place in Rookie of the Year voting, while Francis averaged 21.0 points, 6.2 rebounds, 6.2 assists and 1.7 steals per game, and Cuttino Mobley provided the team with 17.5 points per game. In addition, Glen Rice contributed 9.0 points per game, while second-year forward Eddie Griffin provided with 8.6 points, 6.0 rebounds and 1.4 blocks per game, and Maurice Taylor averaged 8.4 points per game off the bench.

This season was also head coach Rudy Tomjanovich's last as he would step down following the season due to health issues, though he would return in 2004 to coach the Lakers. Also following the season, Posey signed as a free agent with the Memphis Grizzlies, while Griffin was released to free agency, and Rice was traded to the Utah Jazz, but was released and signed with the Los Angeles Clippers.

Offseason

Draft picks

Roster

Note
Bold = All-Star selection

Regular season

Season standings

Record vs. opponents

Game log

Player statistics

Legend

Season

Awards and records

Awards
Yao Ming, NBA All-Rookie Team 1st Team

Records

Transactions

Trades

Free agents

Additions

Subtractions

See also
2002–03 NBA season

References

Houston Rockets seasons